Unofficial South American Championships in Athletics were held in
Buenos Aires, Argentina on May 24–26, 1918.  The event was entitled
"Campeonato de Iniciación".  It was organized by the
"Federación Pedestre Argentina", the predecessor of the "Federación Atlética
Argentina" (founded in 1919) and the "Confederación Argentina de Atletismo" (founded in 1954), and
was then representing Argentinian athletics.

In a historical meeting on May 24, 1918, in the "salón de honor" (hall of fame) of the
newspaper "La Razón", its director, Eloy María Prieto, together with 
Leopoldo Falconi, Carlos Fanta and Alfredo Betteley, representatives from Chile, and
Dr. Francisco Ghigliani, representative from Uruguay, decided the foundation of the Confederación
Sudamericana de Atletismo nowadays known as ConSudAtle.

Medal summary
Medal winners are published.

Men

* = Actual distance was 40.2 km

Medal table (unofficial)

References

External links
gbrathletics.com

U 1918
1918 in Argentine sport
1918 in athletics (track and field)
 Sports competitions in Buenos Aires
1918 in South American sport
A